is a retired Japanese actress.

Career
Wakabayashi is best known in English-speaking countries for her role as Bond girl Aki in the 1967 James Bond film You Only Live Twice. Before this, she had made many films in her native Japan, especially Toho Studio's monster films, such as Dagora, the Space Monster (1964) and Ghidorah, the Three-Headed Monster (1964), both of which were also released under various other titles.  In Ghidorah, she played a mystical princess, who could predict the future and was also a prophetess.

When production of You Only Live Twice began, Wakabayashi was slated to play the role of Kissy Suzuki while her co-star Mie Hama played Suki, one of Tiger Tanaka's top agents. When learning English proved to be a major hurdle to Hama, the women switched roles, with Hama playing the smaller part of Kissy and Wakabayashi playing the larger part of Suki. At her suggestion, the character of Suki was renamed Aki. They had acted together in King Kong vs. Godzilla (1962) and Kokusai himitsu keisatsu: Kagi no kagi (1965), from which footage was recut to make Woody Allen's What's Up Tiger Lily?.

In 1971, she made an appearance in an episode of Shirley's World. Wakabayashi made only one more film (and a guest TV appearance) before disappearing from both the big and small screen. In an interview in G-FAN magazine (No. 76), Wakabayashi said she retired from acting owing to injuries sustained while making a film.

Selected filmography

References

External links
 

1939 births
20th-century Japanese actresses
Actresses from Tokyo
Living people
People from Ōta, Tokyo